Still Winning is the sixth studio album by American R&B singer Johnny Gill. It was released on October 11, 2011, through independent imprint Notifi Records.  Gill's first album of solo material since 1996's Let's Get the Mood Right, it peaked at number 17 on the US Billboard 200 and number 4 on the Billboard R&B chart. Three singles were released from the album: "In the Mood", "It Would Be You" and "Just the Way You Are". In addition to original songs, the album closes with a cover of the Paul McCartney and Wings song "My Love."

Critical reception
The album received mixed to negative reviews from critics. Andy Kellman of AllMusic rated it two stars out of five, stating that "not much [was] memorable" about the album and that Gill often sounded "distanced". Chris Rizik of SoulTracks stated that the album was inconsistent and had a "forgettable start", but went on to state that the album improved mid-disc and then concluded that the album was "mildly recommended" to consumers.

Track listing

Charts

References

External links
 
 

2011 albums
Johnny Gill albums